Some Like It Hot, reissued for television as Rhythm Romance, is a 1939 comedy film starring Bob Hope, Shirley Ross, and Gene Krupa.  Directed by George Archainbaud, its screenplay was written by Wilkie C. Mahoney and Lewis R. Foster, based on the play The Great Magoo by Ben Hecht and Gene Fowler, which performed briefly on Broadway in 1932.  The film was released the year before Road to Singapore converted theatre and radio star Hope into a huge movie box office draw. Legendary cinematographer Karl Struss filmed the movie.

The title of the film is taken from a nursery rhyme, and bears no relation to Billy Wilder's acclaimed 1959 comedy film Some Like It Hot starring Marilyn Monroe, Jack Lemmon, and Tony Curtis.

Plot summary
Nicky Nelson is a sidewalk entrepreneur who tries to lure passersby to see his friend Gene Krupa's band. As the strategy fails, he takes the musicians to a club, where he meets singer Lily Racquel. He takes advantage of her while pretending to help her, but love ultimately redeems him.

Cast
 Bob Hope as Nicky Nelson
 Shirley Ross as Lily Racquet
 Una Merkel as Flo Saunders
 Gene Krupa as himself
 Rufe Davis as Stoney
 Bernard Nedell as Stephen Hanratty
 Frank Sully as Sailor Burke
 Bernadene Hayes as Miss Marble
 Richard Denning as Mr. Weems

Notes

External links
 
 
 
 

1939 romantic comedy films
1939 films
American black-and-white films
Films directed by George Archainbaud
American romantic comedy films
1930s English-language films
1930s American films